Esther Mountain is a mountain located in Essex County, New York. The mountain is the northernmost of the High Peaks of the Adirondack Mountains and its 28th highest peak. It was the only High Peak named for a woman until 2014, having been named in honor of Esther McComb, who made the first recorded climb to the summit in 1839, at age 15; at the time she was attempting to climb Whiteface Mountain from the north (Whiteface is a higher mountain which flanks Esther to the south).

Esther Mountain stands within the watershed of Lake Champlain, which drains into Canada's Richelieu River, the Saint Lawrence River, and into the Gulf of Saint Lawrence.
The southeast side of Esther Mtn. drains into White Brook, thence into the West Branch of the Ausable River, which drains into Lake Champlain.
The southwest and north sides of Esther Mountain drain into Frenchs Brook, thence into the Saranac River, and into Champlain.

The Whiteface Mountain Memorial Highway, which was opened in 1935, traverses the north and west sides of Esther on the way to the summit of Whiteface.

See also 
 List of mountains in New York
 Northeast 111 4,000-footers
 Adirondack Forty-sixers

References

External links 
 
 Hiking Esther Mountain | PureAdirondacks.com

Mountains of Essex County, New York
Adirondack High Peaks
Mountains of New York (state)